National Highway 161AA, commonly called NH 161AA is a national highway in  India. It is a spur road of National Highway 61 through NH 161.  NH-161AA traverses the state of Telangana in India.

Route 
Sangareddy, Narsapur, Toopran, Gajwel, Pragnapur, Jagdevpur, Bhuvanagiri, Choutuppal.

Junctions  
 
  Terminal near Sangareddy.
  Terminal near Bhuvanagiri.
  Terminal near Choutuppal.

See also 
 List of National Highways in India
 List of National Highways in India by state

References

External links 

 NH 161AA on OpenStreetMap

National highways in India
National Highways in Telangana